Milton H. Bren (June 14, 1904 – December 14, 1979) was a Hollywood movie producer and real estate developer.

Biography
Bren was born in Los Angeles in 1904 to a Jewish family, the son of Sadie (née Simon) and Harry Bren. He first worked as a talent agent. In 1937, he accepted a job at Hal Roach Studios as an associate producer where he produced the film Topper, the studio's first feature film, which was wildly successful. In 1938, he was elevated to producer. In March 1939, he accepted a job at Metro-Goldwyn-Mayer as a producer eventually becoming an Executive Vice President. From 1939–1940 he maintained a home in Palm Springs, California. He later served in the United States Navy during World War II as a lieutenant commander.

Milton Bren later became a real estate developer known for developing part of Sunset Strip.

Select filmography
 Topper (1937) – associate producer
 Merrily We Live (1938) – producer
 Swiss Miss (1938) – production supervisor (uncredited) 
 There Goes My Heart (1938) – producer
 Topper Takes a Trip (1938) – producer
 Remember? (1939) – producer
 Wyoming (1940) – producer
 Free and Easy (1941) – producer (uncredited)
 Barnacle Bill (1941) – producer
 Tars and Spars (1946) – producer
 Borderline (1950) – producer and presenter
 Three for Bedroom "C" (1952) – Writer and director

Personal life
In 1930, at age 27, Bren married 18-year-old Marion Newbert who was of partial Irish descent. They divorced in 1948. (Newbert remarried in 1953 to steel businessman Earle M. Jorgensen and became a prominent philanthropist). They had two sons: Donald, who became chairman of the Irvine Company in Newport Beach, California, and Peter, chairman of KBS Realty Advisors, Inc. in New York City at the time of his death in 2019.

In 1948, Bren remarried, to Academy Award-winning actress Claire Trevor; they remained married until his death. Bren's grandson, Steve, is a former professional auto racing driver.

Death
Milton Bren died on December 14, 1979, aged 75, in Orange, California from a brain tumor.

References

External links
 Milton Bren profile, IMDb.com; retrieved March 7, 2013

1904 births
1979 deaths
Jewish American military personnel
Film producers from California
American real estate businesspeople
Businesspeople from Los Angeles
People from Greater Los Angeles
People from Palm Springs, California
Deaths from brain cancer in the United States
20th-century American businesspeople
United States Navy personnel of World War II
United States Navy officers
20th-century American Jews
Military personnel from California
Jewish American film producers